The Four Nations Friendship Cup was a competition played in June 2015. The competition was used to help teams to prepare for the 2015 Pacific Games.

Participating teams

Group stage

Awards
The Golden Ball Award is awarded to the most outstanding player of the tournament. The Golden Glove Award is awarded to the best goalkeeper of the tournament. The Golden Boot Award is awarded to the top scorer of the tournament. The Fair Play Award is awarded to the team with the best disciplinary record at the tournament.

Goal scorers

2 goals
 Christopher Wasasala

1 goal
 Brian Kaltack
 Jean-Brice Wadriako 
 Leon Wahnawe 
 Nathaniel Hmaen  
 Nilua Nickson Nikau 
 Shaffy Mandaoue 
 Tutizama Tanito

See also
Men's Football at the 2015 Pacific Games
Football at the 2016 Summer Olympics

References

External links
 Official VFF website

2014–15 in OFC football
2014–15 in Vanuatuan football
2015